This is a list of bird species confirmed in the Canadian province of Quebec. Unless otherwise noted, the list is that of the Regroupement QuébecOiseaux (RQ) Checklist of the Birds of Quebec as of April 2021. The RQ Checklist contains 471 species. Of them, 152 are casual as defined below. Four species are extinct and sieven species were introduced to North America. The list does not include species of unknown or captive origin.

This list is presented in the taxonomic sequence of the Check-list of North and Middle American Birds, 7th edition through the 62nd Supplement, published by the American Ornithological Society (AOS). Common and scientific names are also those of the Check-list, except that Canadian English spellings are used and the common names of families are from the Clements taxonomy because the AOS list does not include them. French names in parentheses are from the RQ Checklist.

The following tags are used to describe some categories of occurrence.

 (C) Casual - species which neither breed in Quebec nor are regular migrants
 (I) Introduced - introduced to North America by humans, but not necessarily directly introduced in Quebec

Ducks, geese, and waterfowl
Order: AnseriformesFamily: Anatidae

Anatidae includes the ducks and most duck-like waterfowl, such as geese and swans. These birds are adapted to an aquatic existence with webbed feet, bills which are flattened to a greater or lesser extent, and feathers that are excellent at shedding water due to special oils.

Black-bellied whistling-duck, Dendrocygna autumnalis (C)
Fulvous whistling-duck, Dendrocygna bicolor (C)
Snow goose, Anser caerulescens
Ross's goose, Anser rossii
Greater white-fronted goose, Anser albifrons
Taiga bean-goose, Anser fabalis (C)
Tundra bean-goose, Anser serrirostris (C)
Pink-footed goose, Anser brachyrhynchus (C)
Greylag goose, Anser anser (C)
Brant, Branta bernicla
Barnacle goose, Branta leucopsis (C)
Cackling goose, Branta hutchinsii
Canada goose, Branta canadensis
Mute swan, Cygnus olor (I)
Trumpeter swan, Cygnus buccinator
Tundra swan, Cygnus columbianus
Common shelduck, Tadorna tadorna (C)
Wood duck, Aix sponsa
Garganey, Spatula querquedula (C)
Blue-winged teal, Spatula discors
Cinnamon teal, Spatula cyanoptera (C)
Northern shoveler, Spatula clypeata
Gadwall, Mareca strepera
Eurasian wigeon, Mareca penelope
American wigeon, Mareca americana
Mallard, Anas platyrhynchos
American black duck, Anas rubripes
Northern pintail, Anas acuta
Green-winged teal, Anas crecca
Canvasback, Aythya valisineria
Redhead, Aythya americana
Ring-necked duck, Aythya collaris
Tufted duck, Aythya fuligula (C)
Greater scaup, Aythya marila
Lesser scaup, Aythya affinis
Steller's eider, Polysticta stelleri (C)
King eider, Somateria spectabilis
Common eider, Somateria mollissima
Harlequin duck, Histrionicus histrionicus
Labrador duck, Camptorhynchus labradorius (Extinct)
Surf scoter, Melanitta perspicillata
White-winged scoter, Melanitta deglandi
Black scoter, Melanitta americana
Long-tailed duck, Clangula hyemalis
Bufflehead, Bucephala albeola
Common goldeneye, Bucephala clangula
Barrow's goldeneye, Bucephala islandica
Hooded merganser, Lophodytes cucullatus
Common merganser, Mergus merganser
Red-breasted merganser, Mergus serrator
Ruddy duck, Oxyura jamaicensis

Pheasants, grouse, and allies
Order: GalliformesFamily: Phasianidae

Phasianidae consists of the pheasants and their allies. These are terrestrial species, variable in size but generally plump with broad relatively short wings. Many species are gamebirds or have been domesticated as a food source for humans.

Wild turkey, Meleagris gallopavo
Ruffed grouse, Bonasa umbellus
Spruce grouse, Canachites canadensis
Willow ptarmigan, Lagopus lagopus
Rock ptarmigan, Lagopus mutus
Sharp-tailed grouse, Tympanuchus phasianellus
Grey partridge, Perdix perdix (I)

Grebes
Order: PodicipediformesFamily: Podicipedidae

Grebes are small to medium-large freshwater diving birds. They have lobed toes and are excellent swimmers and divers. However, they have their feet placed far back on the body, making them quite ungainly on land.

Pied-billed grebe, Podilymbus podiceps
Horned grebe, Podiceps auritus
Red-necked grebe, Podiceps grisegena
Eared grebe, Podiceps nigricollis (C)
Western grebe, Aechmorphorus occidentalis (C)

Pigeons and doves
Order: ColumbiformesFamily: Columbidae

Pigeons and doves are stout-bodied birds with short necks and short slender bills with a fleshy cere. They feed on seeds, fruit and plants. Unlike most other birds, the doves and pigeons produce "crop milk," which is secreted by a sloughing of fluid-filled cells from the lining of the crop. Both sexes produce this highly nutritious substance to feed to the young.

Rock pigeon, Columba livia (I)
Common wood pigeon, Columba palumbus (C)
Band-tailed pigeon, Patagioenas fasciata (C)
Eurasian collared-dove, Streptopelia decaocto (I)
Passenger pigeon, Ectopistes migratorius (Extinct)
Common ground dove, Columbina passerina (C)
White-winged dove, Zenaida asiatica (C)
Mourning dove, Zenaida macroura

Cuckoos
Order: CuculiformesFamily: Cuculidae

The family Cuculidae includes cuckoos, roadrunners, and anis. These birds are of variable size with slender bodies, long tails, and strong legs.

Common cuckoo, Cuculus canorus (C)
Yellow-billed cuckoo, Coccyzus americanus
Black-billed cuckoo, Coccyzus erythropthalmus

Nightjars and allies
Order: CaprimulgiformesFamily: Caprimulgidae

Nightjars are medium-sized nocturnal birds that usually nest on the ground. They have long wings, short legs, and very short bills. Most have small feet, of little use for walking, and long pointed wings. Their soft plumage is cryptically coloured to resemble bark or leaves.

Common nighthawk,  Chordeiles minor
Chuck-will's-widow, Antrostomus carolinensis (C)
Eastern whip-poor-will, Antrostomus vociferus

Swifts
Order: ApodiformesFamily: Apodidae

The swifts are small birds which spend the majority of their lives flying. These birds have very short legs and never settle voluntarily on the ground, perching instead only on vertical surfaces. Many swifts have long swept-back wings which resemble a crescent or boomerang.

Chimney swift, Chaetura pelagica
Common swift, Apus apus (C)

Hummingbirds
Order: ApodiformesFamily: Trochilidae

Hummingbirds are small birds capable of hovering in mid-air due to the rapid flapping of their wings. They are the only birds that can fly backwards.

Mexican violetear, Colibri thalassinus (C)
Amethyst-throated mountain-gem, Lampornis amethystinus (C)
Ruby-throated hummingbird, Archilochus colubris
Anna's hummingbird, Calypte anna (C)
Rufous hummingbird, Selasphorus rufus (C)
Broad-billed hummingbird, Cynanthus latirostris (C)

Rails, gallinules, and coots
Order: GruiformesFamily: Rallidae

Rallidae is a large family of small to medium-sized birds which includes the rails, crakes, coots, and gallinules. The most typical family members occupy dense vegetation in damp environments near lakes, swamps, or rivers. In general they are shy and secretive birds, making them difficult to observe. Most species have strong legs and long toes which are well adapted to soft uneven surfaces. They tend to have short, rounded wings and to be weak fliers.

Clapper rail, Rallus crepitans (C)
King rail, Rallus elegans (C)
Virginia rail, Rallus limicola
Sora, Porzana carolina
Common gallinule, Gallinula galeata
Eurasian coot, Fulica atra (C)
American coot, Fulica americana
Purple gallinule, Porphyrio martinicus (C)
Yellow rail, Coturnicops noveboracensis

Cranes
Order: GruiformesFamily: Gruidae

Cranes are large, long-legged and long-necked birds. Unlike the similar-looking but unrelated herons, cranes fly with necks outstretched, not pulled back. Most have elaborate and noisy courting displays or "dances".

Sandhill crane, Antigone canadensis
Common crane, Grus grus (C)
Whooping crane, Grus americana (C)

Stilts and avocets
Order: CharadriiformesFamily: Recurvirostridae

Recurvirostridae is a family of large wading birds which includes the avocets and stilts.  The avocets have long legs and long up-curved bills. The stilts have extremely long legs and long, thin, straight bills.

Black-necked stilt, Himantopus mexicanus (C)
American avocet, Recurvirostra americana (C)

Oystercatchers
Order: CharadriiformesFamily: Haematopodidae

The oystercatchers are large, obvious, and noisy plover-like birds, with strong bills used for smashing or prying open molluscs.

American oystercatcher, Haematopus palliatus (C)

Plovers and lapwings
Order: CharadriiformesFamily: Charadriidae

The family Charadriidae includes the plovers, dotterels, and lapwings.  They are small to medium-sized birds with compact bodies, short thick necks, and long, usually pointed, wings. They are found in open country worldwide, mostly in habitats near water.

Northern lapwing, Vanellus vanellus (C)
Black-bellied plover, Pluvialis squatarola
European golden-plover, Pluvialis apricaria (C)
American golden-plover, Pluvialis dominica
Killdeer, Charadrius vociferus
Common ringed plover, Charadrius hiaticula (C)
Semipalmated plover, Charadrius semipalmatus
Piping plover, Charadrius melodus
Wilson's plover, Charadrius wilsonia (C)

Sandpipers and allies
Order: CharadriiformesFamily: Scolopacidae

Scolopacidae is a large diverse family of small to medium-sized shorebirds including the sandpipers, curlews, godwits, shanks, tattlers, woodcocks, snipes, dowitchers, and phalaropes.  The majority of these species eat small invertebrates picked out of the mud or soil. Different lengths of legs and bills enable multiple species to feed in the same habitat, particularly on the coast, without direct competition for food.

Upland sandpiper, Bartramia longicauda
Whimbrel, Numenius phaeopus
Eskimo curlew, Numenius borealis (Extinct)
Bar-tailed godwit, Limosa lapponica (C)
Black-tailed godwit, Limosa limosa (C)
Hudsonian godwit, Limosa haemastica
Marbled godwit, Limosa fedoa
Ruddy turnstone, Arenaria interpres
Red knot, Calidris canutus
Ruff, Calidris pugnax (C)
Sharp-tailed sandpiper, Calidris acuminata (C)
Stilt sandpiper, Calidris himantopus
Curlew sandpiper, Calidris ferruginea (C)
Red-necked stint, Calidris ruficollis (C)
Sanderling, Calidris alba
Dunlin, Calidris alpina
Purple sandpiper, Calidris maritima
Baird's sandpiper, Calidris bairdii
Least sandpiper, Calidris minutilla
White-rumped sandpiper, Calidris fuscicollis
Buff-breasted sandpiper, Calidris subruficollis
Pectoral sandpiper, Calidris melanotos
Semipalmated sandpiper, Calidris pusilla
Western sandpiper, Calidris mauri
Short-billed dowitcher, Limnodromus griseus
Long-billed dowitcher, Limnodromus scolopaceus
American woodcock, Scolopax minor
Wilson's snipe, Gallinago delicata
Spotted sandpiper, Actitis macularia
Solitary sandpiper, Tringa solitaria
Lesser yellowlegs, Tringa flavipes
Willet, Tringa semipalmata
Common greenshank, Tringa nebularia (C)
Greater yellowlegs, Tringa melanoleuca
Wilson's phalarope, Phalaropus tricolor
Red-necked phalarope, Phalaropus lobatus
Red phalarope, Phalaropus fulicarius

Skuas and jaegers
Order: CharadriiformesFamily: Stercorariidae

Skuas and jaegers are in general medium to large birds, typically with grey or brown plumage, often with white markings on the wings. They have longish bills with hooked tips and webbed feet with sharp claws. They look like large dark gulls, but have a fleshy cere above the upper mandible. They are strong, acrobatic fliers.

Pomarine jaeger, Stercorarius pomarinus
Parasitic jaeger, Stercorarius parasiticus
Long-tailed jaeger, Stercorarius longicaudus

Auks, murres, and puffins
Order: CharadriiformesFamily: Alcidae

Alcids are superficially similar to penguins due to their black-and-white colours, their upright posture, and some of their habits, however they are only distantly related to the penguins and are able to fly. Auks live on the open sea, only deliberately coming ashore to nest.

Dovekie, Alle alle
Common murre, Uria aalge
Thick-billed murre, Uria lomvia
Razorbill, Alca torda
Great auk, Pinguinus impennis (Extinct)
Black guillemot, Cepphus grylle
Long-billed murrelet, Brachyramphus perdix (C)
Ancient murrelet, Synthliboramphus antiquus (C)
Atlantic puffin, Fratercula arctica

Gulls, terns, and skimmers
Order: CharadriiformesFamily: Laridae

Laridae is a family of medium to large seabirds and includes gulls, terns, kittiwakes, and skimmers. They are typically grey or white, often with black markings on the head or wings. They have stout, longish bills and webbed feet.

Black-legged kittiwake, Rissa tridactyla
Ivory gull, Pagophila eburnea (C)
Sabine's gull, Xema sabini
Bonaparte's gull, Chroicocephalus philadelphia
Black-headed gull, Chroicocephalus ridibundus
Little gull, Hydrocoleus minutus
Ross's gull, Rhodostethia rosea (C)
Laughing gull, Leucophaeus atricilla (C)
Franklin's gull, Leucophaeus pipixcan (C)
Black-tailed gull, Larus crassirostris (C)
Common gull (Larus canus (C)
Short-billed gullLarus brachyrhynchus (C)
Ring-billed gull, Larus delawarensis
California gull, Larus californicus (C)
herring gull, Larus argentatus
Yellow-legged gull, Larus cachinnans (C)
Iceland gull, Larus glaucoides
Lesser black-backed gull, Larus fuscus
Slaty-backed gull, Larus schistisagus (C)
Glaucous gull, Larus hyperboreus
Great black-backed gull, Larus marinus
Sooty tern, Onychoprion fuscatus (C)
Gull-billed tern, Gelochelidon nilotica (C)
Caspian tern, Hydroprogne caspia
Black tern, Chlidonias niger
White-winged tern, Chlidonias leucopterus (C)
Roseate tern, Sterna dougallii (C)
Common tern, Sterna hirundo
Arctic tern, Sterna paradisaea
Forster's tern, Sterna forsteri (C)
Royal tern, Thalasseus maximus (C)
Sandwich tern, Thalasseus sandvicensis (C)
Black skimmer, Rynchops niger (C)

Loons
Order: GaviiformesFamily: Gaviidae

Loons are aquatic birds the size of a large duck, to which they are unrelated. Their plumage is largely grey or black, and they have spear-shaped bills. Loons swim well and fly adequately, but are almost hopeless on land, because their legs are placed towards the rear of the body.

Red-throated loon, Gavia stellata
Pacific loon, Gavia pacifica
Common loon, Gavia immer

Albatrosses
Order: ProcellariiformesFamily: Diomedeidae

The albatrosses are amongst the largest of flying birds, and the great albatrosses from the genus Diomedea have the largest wingspans of any extant birds.

Yellow-nosed albatross, Thalassarche chlororhynchos (C)

Southern storm-petrels
Order: ProcellariiformesFamily: Oceanitidae

The storm-petrels are the smallest seabirds, relatives of the petrels, feeding on planktonic crustaceans and small fish picked from the surface, typically while hovering. The flight is fluttering and sometimes bat-like. Until 2018, this family's three species were included with the other storm-petrels in family Hydrobatidae.

Wilson's storm-petrel, Oceanites oceanicus

Northern storm-petrels
Order: ProcellariiformesFamily: Hydrobatidae

Though the members of this family are similar in many respects to the southern storm-petrels, including their general appearance and habits, there are enough genetic differences to warrant their placement in a separate family.

Leach's storm-petrel, Hydrobates leucorhous

Shearwaters and petrels
Order: ProcellariiformesFamily: Procellariidae

The procellariids are the main group of medium-sized "true petrels", characterized by united nostrils with medium septum and a long outer functional primary.

Northern fulmar, Fulmarus glacialis
Cory's shearwater, Calonectris diomedea (C)
Sooty shearwater, Ardenna griseus
Great shearwater, Ardenna gravis
Manx shearwater, Puffinus puffinus

Storks
Order: CiconiiformesFamily: Ciconiidae

Storks are large, heavy, long-legged, long-necked wading birds with long stout bills and wide wingspans. They lack the powder down that other wading birds such as herons, spoonbills and ibises use to clean off fish slime. Storks lack a pharynx and are mute.

Wood stork, Mycteria americana (C)

Frigatebirds
Order: SuliformesFamily: Fregatidae

Frigatebirds are large seabirds usually found over tropical oceans. They are large, black, or black-and-white, with long wings and deeply forked tails. The males have coloured inflatable throat pouches. They do not swim or walk and cannot take off from a flat surface. Having the largest wingspan-to-body-weight ratio of any bird, they are essentially aerial, able to stay aloft for more than a week.

Magnificent frigatebird, Fregata magnificens (C)

Boobies and gannets
Order: SuliformesFamily: Sulidae

The sulids comprise the gannets and boobies. Both groups are medium-large coastal seabirds that plunge-dive for fish.

Brown booby, Sula leucogaster (C)
Northern gannet, Morus bassanus

Cormorants and shags
Order: SuliformesFamily: Phalacrocoracidae

Cormorants are medium-to-large aquatic birds, usually with mainly dark plumage and areas of coloured skin on the face. The bill is long, thin, and sharply hooked. Their feet are four-toed and webbed.

Great cormorant, Phalacrocorax carbo
Double-crested cormorant, Nannopterum auritum
Neotropic cormorant, Nannopterum brasilianum (C)

Pelicans
Order: PelecaniformesFamily: Pelecanidae

Pelicans are very large water birds with a distinctive pouch under their beak. Like other birds in the order Pelecaniformes, they have four webbed toes.

American white pelican, Pelecanus erythrorhynchos (C)
Brown pelican, Pelecanus occidentalis (C)

Herons, egrets, and bitterns
Order: PelecaniformesFamily: Ardeidae

The family Ardeidae contains the herons, egrets, and bitterns. Herons and egrets are medium to large wading birds with long necks and legs. Bitterns tend to be shorter necked and more secretive. Members of Ardeidae fly with their necks retracted, unlike other long-necked birds such as storks, ibises, and spoonbills.

American bittern, Botaurus lentiginosus
Least bittern, Ixobrychus exilis
Great blue heron, Ardea herodias
Great egret, Ardea alba
Little egret, Egretta garzetta (C)
Snowy egret, Egretta thula (C)
Little blue heron, Egretta caerulea (C)
Tricolored heron, Egretta tricolor (C)
Cattle egret, Bubulcus ibis (C)
Green heron, Butorides virescens
Black-crowned night-heron, Nycticorax nycticorax
Yellow-crowned night-heron, Nyctanassa violacea (C)

Ibises and spoonbills
Order: PelecaniformesFamily: Threskiornithidae

The family Threskiornithidae includes the ibises and spoonbills. They have long, broad wings. Their bodies tend to be elongated, the neck more so, with rather long legs. The bill is also long, decurved in the case of the ibises, straight and distinctively flattened in the spoonbills.

White ibis, Eudocimus albus (C)
Glossy ibis, Plegadis falcinellus (C)
White-faced ibis, Plegadis chihi (C)
Roseate spoonbill, Ajaia ajaja (C)

New World vultures
Order: CathartiformesFamily: Cathartidae

The New World vultures are not closely related to Old World vultures, but superficially resemble them because of convergent evolution. Like the Old World vultures, they are scavengers. However, unlike Old World vultures, which find carcasses by sight, New World vultures have a good sense of smell with which they locate carcasses.

Black vulture, Coragyps atratus (C)
Turkey vulture, Cathartes aura

Osprey
Order: AccipitriformesFamily: Pandionidae

Pandionidae is a family of fish-eating birds of prey possessing a very large, powerful hooked beak for tearing flesh from their prey, strong legs, powerful talons, and keen eyesight. The family is monotypic.

Osprey, Pandion haliaetus

Hawks, eagles, and kites
Order: AccipitriformesFamily: Accipitridae

Accipitridae is a family of birds of prey which includes hawks, eagles, kites, harriers, and Old World vultures. These birds have very large powerful hooked beaks for tearing flesh from their prey, strong legs, powerful talons, and keen eyesight.

Swallow-tailed kite, Elanoides forficatus (C)
Golden eagle, Aquila chrysaetos
Northern harrier, Circus hudsonius
Sharp-shinned hawk, Accipiter striatus
Cooper's hawk, Accipiter cooperii
Northern goshawk, Accipiter gentilis
Bald eagle, Haliaeetus leucocephalus
Steller's sea-eagle, Haliaeetus pelagicus (C)
Mississippi kite, Ictinia mississippiensis (C)
Red-shouldered hawk, Buteo lineatus
Broad-winged hawk, Buteo platypterus
Swainson's hawk, Buteo swainsoni (C)
Red-tailed hawk, Buteo jamaicensis
Rough-legged hawk, Buteo lagopus

Barn-owls
Order: StrigiformesFamily: Tytonidae

Owls in the family Tytonidae are medium to large owls with large heads and characteristic heart-shaped faces.

Barn owl, Tyto Alba

Owls
Order: StrigiformesFamily: Strigidae

Typical owls are small to large solitary nocturnal birds of prey. They have large forward-facing eyes and ears, a hawk-like beak, and a conspicuous circle of feathers around each eye called a facial disk.

Eastern screech-owl, Megascops asio
Great horned owl, Bubo virginianus
Snowy owl, Bubo scandiacus
Northern hawk owl, Surnia ulula
Burrowing owl, Athene cunicularia (C)
Barred owl, Strix varia
Great grey owl, Strix nebulosa
Long-eared owl, Asio otus
Short-eared owl, Asio flammeus
Boreal owl, Aegolius funereus
Northern saw-whet owl, Aegolius acadicus

Kingfishers
Order: CoraciiformesFamily: Alcedinidae

Kingfishers are medium-sized birds with large heads, long, pointed bills, short legs, and stubby tails.

Belted kingfisher, Megaceryle alcyon

Woodpeckers
Order: PiciformesFamily: Picidae

Woodpeckers are small to medium-sized birds with chisel-like beaks, short legs, stiff tails, and long tongues used for capturing insects. Some species have feet with two toes pointing forward and two backward, while several species have only three toes. Many woodpeckers have the habit of tapping noisily on tree trunks with their beaks.

Red-headed woodpecker, Melanerpes erythrocephalus
Red-bellied woodpecker, Melanerpes carolinus
Yellow-bellied sapsucker, Sphyrapicus varius
American three-toed woodpecker, Picoides dorsalis
Black-backed woodpecker, Picoides arcticus
Downy woodpecker, Dryobates pubescens
Hairy woodpecker, Dryobates villosus
Northern flicker, Colaptes auratus
Pileated woodpecker, Dryocopus pileatus

Falcons and caracaras
Order: FalconiformesFamily: Falconidae

Falconidae is a family of diurnal birds of prey, notably the falcons and caracaras. They differ from hawks, eagles, and kites in that they kill with their beaks instead of their talons.

Crested caracara, Caracara plancus (C)
American kestrel, Falco sparverius
Merlin, Falco columbarius
Gyrfalcon, Falco rusticolus
Peregrine falcon, Falco peregrinus

Tyrant flycatchers
Order: PasseriformesFamily: Tyrannidae

Tyrant flycatchers are Passerine birds which occur throughout North and South America. They superficially resemble the Old World flycatchers, but are more robust and have stronger bills. They do not have the sophisticated vocal capabilities of the songbirds. Most, but not all, are rather plain. As the name implies, most are insectivorous.

Small-billed elaenia, Elaenia parvirostris (C)
Ash-throated flycatcher, Myiarchus cinerascens (C)
Great crested flycatcher, Myiarchus crinitus
Tropical kingbird, Tyrannus melancholicus (C)
Western kingbird, Tyrannus verticalis (C)
Eastern kingbird, Tyrannus tyrannus
Grey kingbird, Tyrannus dominicensis (C)
Scissor-tailed flycatcher, Tyrannus forficatus (C)
Fork-tailed flycatcher, Tyrannus savana (C)
Olive-sided flycatcher, Contopus cooperi
Western wood-pewee, Contopus sordidulus (C)
Eastern wood-pewee, Contopus virens
Yellow-bellied flycatcher, Empidonax flaviventris
Acadian flycatcher, Empidonax virescens (C)
Alder flycatcher, Empidonax alnorum
Willow flycatcher, Empidonax traillii
Least flycatcher, Empidonax minimus
Eastern phoebe, Sayornis phoebe
Say's phoebe, Sayornis saya (C)
Vermilion flycatcher, Pyrocephalus rubinus (C)

Vireos, shrike-babblers, and erpornis
Order: PasseriformesFamily: Vireonidae

The vireos are a group of small to medium-sized passerine birds mostly restricted to the New World, though a few other members of the family are found in Asia. They are typically greenish in colour and resemble wood warblers apart from their heavier bills.

Black-capped vireo, Vireo atricapilla (C)
White-eyed vireo, Vireo griseus (C)
Yellow-throated vireo, Vireo flavifrons
Blue-headed vireo, Vireo solitarius
Philadelphia vireo, Vireo philadelphicus
Warbling vireo, Vireo gilvus
Red-eyed vireo, Vireo olivaceus
Yellow-green vireo, Vireo flavoviridis (C)

Shrikes
Order: PasseriformesFamily: Laniidae

Shrikes are passerine birds known for their habit of catching other birds and small animals and impaling the uneaten portions of their bodies on thorns. A shrike's beak is hooked, like that of a typical bird of prey.

Loggerhead shrike, Lanius ludovicianus
Northern shrike, Lanius borealis

Crows, jays, and magpies
Order: PasseriformesFamily: Corvidae

The family Corvidae includes crows, ravens, jays, choughs, magpies, treepies, nutcrackers, and ground jays. Corvids are above average in size among the Passeriformes, and some of the larger species show high levels of intelligence.

Canada jay, Perisoreus canadensis
Steller's jay, Cyanocitta stelleri (C)
Blue jay, Cyanocitta cristata
Black-billed magpie, Pica hudsonia (C)
Eurasian jackdaw, Corvus monedula (C)
American crow, Corvus brachyrhynchos
Fish crow, Corvus ossifragus (C)
Common raven, Corvus corax

Tits, chickadees, and titmice
Order: PasseriformesFamily: Paridae

The Paridae are mainly small stocky woodland species with short stout bills. Some have crests. They are adaptable birds, with a mixed diet including seeds and insects.

Black-capped chickadee, Poecile atricapilla
Boreal chickadee, Poecile hudsonica
Tufted titmouse, Baeolophus bicolor

Larks
Order: PasseriformesFamily: Alaudidae

Larks are small terrestrial birds with often extravagant songs and display flights. Most larks are fairly dull in appearance. Their food is insects and seeds.

Eurasian skylark, Alauda arvensis (C)
Horned lark, Eremophila alpestris

Swallows
Order: PasseriformesFamily: Hirundinidae

The family Hirundinidae is adapted to aerial feeding. They have a slender streamlined body, long pointed wings, and a short bill with a wide gape. The feet are adapted to perching rather than walking, and the front toes are partially joined at the base.

Bank swallow, Riparia riparia
Tree swallow, Tachycineta bicolor
Violet-green swallow, Tachycineta thalassina (C)
Northern rough-winged swallow, Stelgidopteryx serripennis
Purple martin, Progne subis
Barn swallow, Hirundo rustica
Cliff swallow, Petrochelidon pyrrhonota
Cave swallow, Petrochelidon fulva (C)

Kinglets
Order: PasseriformesFamily: Regulidae

The kinglets are a small family of birds which resemble the titmice. They are very small insectivorous birds. The adults have coloured crowns, giving rise to their name.

Ruby-crowned kinglet, Corthylio calendula
Golden-crowned kinglet, Regulus satrapa

Waxwings
Order: PasseriformesFamily: Bombycillidae

The waxwings are a group of passerine birds with soft silky plumage and unique red tips to some of the wing feathers. In the Bohemian and cedar waxwings, these tips look like sealing wax and give the group its name. These are arboreal birds of northern forests. They live on insects in summer and berries in winter.

Bohemian waxwing, Bombycilla garrulus
Cedar waxwing, Bombycilla cedrorum

Nuthatches
Order: PasseriformesFamily: Sittidae

Nuthatches are small woodland birds. They have the unusual ability to climb down trees head first, unlike other birds which can only go upwards. Nuthatches have big heads, short tails and powerful bills and feet.

Red-breasted nuthatch, Sitta canadensis
White-breasted nuthatch, Sitta carolinensis

Treecreepers
Order: PasseriformesFamily: Certhiidae

Treecreepers are small woodland birds, brown above and white below. They have thin pointed down-curved bills, which they use to extricate insects from bark. They have stiff tail feathers, like woodpeckers, which they use to support themselves on vertical trees.

Brown creeper, Certhia americana

Gnatcatchers
Order: PasseriformesFamily: Polioptilidae

These dainty birds resemble Old World warblers in their structure and habits, moving restlessly through the foliage seeking insects. The gnatcatchers are mainly soft bluish grey in colour and have the typical insectivore's long sharp bill. Many species have distinctive black head patterns (especially males) and long, regularly cocked, black-and-white tails.

Blue-grey gnatcatcher, Polioptila caerulea

Wrens
Order: PasseriformesFamily: Troglodytidae

Wrens are small and inconspicuous birds, except for their loud songs. They have short wings and thin down-turned bills. Several species often hold their tails upright. All are insectivorous.

Rock wren, Salpinctes obsoletus (C)
House wren, Troglodytes aedon
Winter wren, Troglodytes hiemalis
Sedge wren, Cistothorus platensis
Marsh wren, Cistothorus palustris
Carolina wren, Thryothorus ludovicianus

Mockingbirds and thrashers
Order: PasseriformesFamily: Mimidae

The mimids are a family of passerine birds which includes thrashers, mockingbirds, tremblers, and the New World catbirds. These birds are notable for their vocalization, especially their remarkable ability to mimic a wide variety of birds and other sounds heard outdoors. The species tend towards dull greys and browns in their appearance.

Grey catbird, Dumetella carolinensis
Brown thrasher, Toxostoma rufum
Northern mockingbird, Mimus polyglottos

Starlings
Order: PasseriformesFamily: Sturnidae

Starlings and mynas are small to medium-sized Old World passerine birds with strong feet. Their flight is strong and direct and most are very gregarious. Their preferred habitat is fairly open country, and they eat insects and fruit. The plumage of several species is dark with a metallic sheen.

European starling, Sturnus vulgaris (I)

Thrushes and allies
Order: PasseriformesFamily: Turdidae

The thrushes are a group of passerine birds that occur mainly but not exclusively in the Old World. They are plump, soft plumaged, small to medium-sized insectivores or sometimes omnivores, often feeding on the ground. Many have attractive songs.

Eastern bluebird, Sialia sialis
Mountain bluebird, Sialia currucoides (C)
Townsend's solitaire, Myadestes townsendi (C)
Veery, Catharus fuscescens
Grey-cheeked thrush, Catharus minimus
Bicknell's thrush, Catharus bicknelli
Swainson's thrush, Catharus ustulatus
Hermit thrush, Catharus guttatus
Wood thrush, Hylocichla mustelina
Fieldfare, Turdus pilaris (C)
Redwing, Turdus iliacus (C)
Song thrush, Turdus philomelos (C)
American robin, Turdus migratorius
Varied thrush, Ixoreus naevius (C)

Old World flycatchers
Order: PasseriformesFamily: Muscicapidae

The Old World flycatchers are a large family of small passerine birds. These are mainly small arboreal insectivores, many of which, as the name implies, take their prey on the wing.

Northern wheatear, Oenanthe oenanthe

Old World sparrows
Order: PasseriformesFamily: Passeridae

Old World sparrows are small passerine birds. In general, sparrows tend to be small plump brownish or greyish birds with short tails and short powerful beaks. Sparrows are seed eaters, but they also consume small insects.

House sparrow, Passer domesticus (I)
Eurasian tree sparrow, Passer montanus (I)

Wagtails and pipits
Order: PasseriformesFamily: Motacillidae

Motacillidae is a family of small passerine birds with medium to long tails. They include the wagtails, longclaws and pipits. They are slender ground-feeding insectivores of open country.

White wagtail, Motacilla alba (C)
American pipit, Anthus rubescens

Finches, euphonias, and allies
Order: PasseriformesFamily: Fringillidae

Finches are seed-eating passerine birds, that are small to moderately large and have a strong beak, usually conical and in some species very large. All have twelve tail feathers and nine primaries. These birds have a bouncing flight with alternating bouts of flapping and gliding on closed wings, and most sing well.

Brambling, Fringilla montifringilla (C)
Evening grosbeak, Coccothraustes vespertinus
Pine grosbeak, Pinicola enucleator
Grey-crowned rosy-finch, Leucosticte tephrocotis (C)
House finch, Haemorhous mexicanus (Native to the southwestern U.S.; introduced in the east)
Purple finch, Haemorhous purpureus
Common redpoll, Acanthis flammea
Hoary redpoll, Acanthis hornemanni
Red crossbill, Loxia curvirostra
White-winged crossbill, Loxia leucoptera
Pine siskin, Spinus pinus
American goldfinch, Spinus tristis

Longspurs and snow buntings
Order: PasseriformesFamily: Calcariidae

The Calcariidae are a group of passerine birds that were traditionally grouped with the New World sparrows, but differ in a number of respects and are usually found in open grassy areas.

Lapland longspur, Calcarius lapponicus
Smith's longspur, Calcarius pictus (C)
Snow bunting, Plectrophenax nivalis

New World sparrows
Order: PasseriformesFamily: Passerellidae

Until 2017, these species were considered part of the family Emberizidae. Most of the species are known as sparrows, but these birds are not closely related to the Old World sparrows which are in the family Passeridae. Many of these have distinctive head patterns.

Grasshopper sparrow, Ammodramus savannarum
Black-throated sparrow, Amphispiza bilineata (C)
Lark sparrow, Chondestes grammacus (C)
Lark bunting, Calamospiza melanocorys (C)
Chipping sparrow, Spizella passerina
Clay-coloured sparrow, Spizella pallida
Field sparrow, Spizella pusilla
Brewer's sparrow, Spizella breweri (C)
Fox sparrow, Passerella iliaca
American tree sparrow, Spizelloides arborea
Dark-eyed junco, Junco hyemalis
White-crowned sparrow, Zonotrichia leucophrys
Golden-crowned sparrow, Zonotrichia atricapilla (C)
Harris's sparrow, Zonotrichia querula (C)
White-throated sparrow, Zonotrichia albicollis
Vesper sparrow, Pooecetes gramineus
LeConte's sparrow, Ammospiza leconteii
Seaside sparrow, Ammospiza maritimus (C)
Nelson's sparrow, Ammospiza nelsoni
Henslow's sparrow, Centronyx henslowii
Savannah sparrow, Passerculus sandwichensis
Song sparrow, Melospiza melodia
Lincoln's sparrow, Melospiza lincolnii
Swamp sparrow, Melospiza georgiana
Green-tailed towhee, Pipilo chlorurus (C)
Spotted towhee, Pipilo maculatus  (C)
Eastern towhee, Pipilo erythrophthalmus

Yellow-breasted chat
Order: PasseriformesFamily: Icteriidae

This species was historically placed in the wood-warblers (Parulidae) but nonetheless most authorities were unsure if it belonged there. It was placed in its own family in 2017.

Yellow-breasted chat, Icteria virens (C)

Troupials and allies
Order: PasseriformesFamily: Icteridae

The icterids are a group of small to medium-sized, often colourful passerine birds restricted to the New World and include the grackles, New World blackbirds, and New World orioles. Most species have black as a predominant plumage colour, often enlivened by yellow, orange, or red.

Yellow-headed blackbird, Xanthocephalus xanthocephalus (C)
Bobolink, Dolichonyx oryzivorus
Eastern meadowlark, Sturnella magna
Western meadowlark, Sturnella neglecta
Orchard oriole, Icterus spurius
Hooded oriole, Icterus cucullatus (C)
Bullock's oriole, Icterus bullockii (C)
Baltimore oriole, Icterus galbula
Red-winged blackbird, Agelaius phoeniceus
Brown-headed cowbird, Molothrus ater
Rusty blackbird, Euphagus carolinus
Brewer's blackbird, Euphagus cyanocephalus (C)
Common grackle, Quiscalus quiscula

New World warblers
Order: PasseriformesFamily: Parulidae

The wood-warblers are a group of small, often colourful, passerine birds restricted to the New World. Most are arboreal, but some are more terrestrial. Most members of this family are insectivores.

Ovenbird, Seiurus aurocapilla
Worm-eating warbler, Helmitheros vermivorum (C)
Louisiana waterthrush, Parkesia motacilla
Northern waterthrush, Parkesia noveboracensis
Golden-winged warbler, Vermivora chrysoptera
Blue-winged warbler, Vermivora cyanoptera
Black-and-white warbler, Mniotilta varia
Prothonotary warbler, Protonotaria citrea (C)
Tennessee warbler, Leiothlypis peregrina
Orange-crowned warbler, Leiothlypis celata
Nashville warbler, Leiothlypis ruficapilla
Connecticut warbler, Oporornis agilis
Mourning warbler, Geothlypis philadelphia
Kentucky warbler, Geothlypis formosa (C)
Common yellowthroat, Geothlypis trichas
Hooded warbler, Setophaga citrina (C)
American redstart, Setophaga ruticilla
Kirtland's warbler, Setophaga kirtlandii (C)
Cape May warbler, Setophaga tigrina
Cerulean warbler, Setophaga cerulea
Northern parula, Setophaga americana
Magnolia warbler, Setophaga magnolia
Bay-breasted warbler, Setophaga castanea
Blackburnian warbler, Setophaga fusca
Yellow warbler, Setophaga petechia
Chestnut-sided warbler, Setophaga pensylvanica
Blackpoll warbler, Setophaga striata
Black-throated blue warbler, Setophaga caerulescens
Palm warbler, Setophaga palmarum
Pine warbler, Setophaga pinus
Yellow-rumped warbler, Setophaga coronata
Yellow-throated warbler, Setophaga dominica (C)
Prairie warbler, Setophaga discolor (C)
Black-throated grey warbler, Setophaga nigrescens (C)
Townsend's warbler, Setophaga townsendi (C)
Hermit warbler, Setophaga occidentalis (C)
Black-throated green warbler, Setophaga virens
Canada warbler, Cardellina canadensis
Wilson's warbler, Cardellina pusilla
Painted redstart, Myioborus pictus (C)

Cardinals and allies
Order: PasseriformesFamily: Cardinalidae

The cardinals are a family of robust, seed-eating birds with strong bills. They are typically associated with open woodland. The sexes usually have distinct plumages.

Hepatic tanager, Piranga flava (C)
Summer tanager, Piranga rubra (C)
Scarlet tanager, Piranga olivacea
Western tanager, Piranga ludoviciana (C)
Northern cardinal, Cardinalis cardinalis
Rose-breasted grosbeak, Pheucticus ludovicianus
Black-headed grosbeak, Pheucticus melanocephalus (C)
Blue grosbeak, Passerina caerulea (C)
Lazuli bunting, Passerina amoena (C)
Indigo bunting, Passerina cyanea
Painted bunting, Passerina ciris (C)
Dickcissel, Spiza americana (C)

See also
List of Migratory Bird Sanctuaries of Canada
List of birds in Mont-Tremblant National Park
List of birds
Lists of birds by region

Notes

References

Further reading
 Kaufman, Kenn (2000). Birds of North America, Hillstar Editions L.C. 
 Stokes, Donald W (1996). Stokes field guide to Birds /Eastern region, Little, Brown and Company, Boston. 
 Audubon (1950). Audubon's Birds of America, The Macmillan Company, New York
 Brûlotte, Suzanne (2013). Les oiseaux du Québec, Broquet. 

Quebec
Birds